There are multiple instruments referred to as a bass banjo. The first to enter real production was the five-string cello banjo, tuned one octave below a five-string banjo. This was followed by a four-string cello banjo, tuned CGDA in the same range as a cello or mandocello, and modified upright bass versions tuned EADG. More recently, true bass banjos, tuned EADG and played in conventional horizontal fashion have been introduced.

Five-string cello banjo 

The five-string cello banjo was originally a gut-stringed instrument with a 3" deep 16" diameter rim, marketed by S.S. Stewart in 1889. Advertising copy used the terms "bass banjo" and "cello banjo" to refer to the same instrument.

Other banjo makers manufactured similar instruments, including A.C. Fairbanks, with a  12⅜" diameter head and a 29½" scale length and A.A. Farland, with 12½" head and a 28½" scale. Gold Tone is the only contemporary manufacturer.

Four-string cello banjo 
In 1919, Gibson began manufacturing a 4-string cello banjo, known as the CB-4. Other vintage manufacturers of four-string bass banjos include Bacon & Day. Gold Tone is the only contemporary manufacturer.

Gibson bass banjo 
Gibson produced a separate instrument called a "bass banjo" from 1930 to 1933. This was a 4-string instrument, played as an upright bass, with a stand substituting for a spike. It was tuned EADG, the same as Gibson's mando-bass.

Bassjo 
The Bassjo, also referred to as the banjo bass in a 2006 article featuring Les Claypool on the cover of Bassplayer Magazine was made by luthier Dan Maloney. Maloney was a friend of Claypool's approximately ten years ago when Claypool asked him to construct a guitar with "a banjo body and a bass neck ("Les Does More" 43)." The Bassjo can be heard on Claypool's 2006 album "Of Whales and Woe" on the track Iowan Gal", as well as Primus' "Captain Shiner" from the album Tales from the Punchbowl

Gold Tone bass banjo 
Gold Tone Music Group produces a commercial version of the bass banjo. It has a 32" scale and a 13" pot.

Heftone upright 
An unusual variation is the Heftone bass, which combines a large, 22" banjo pot with an upright spindle to produce an upright bass banjo.

References

Banjo family instruments
Bass (sound)